Abdurrahman Wahid, known as Gus Dur, was impeached and dismissed from presidential office on 23 July 2001, after he issued a decree to dissolve the Indonesian legislature and suspend the Golkar party. 

In response to Wahid's actions, Megawati Sukarnoputri and the People's Consultative Assembly agreed to remove Wahid from office and Megawati took office as the new President.

Background and impeachment

The 2001 Special Session was held with the agenda of dismissing Abdurrahman Wahid after various conflicts with the parliament. This action was preceded by the issuance of the first memorandum on February 1, 2001. Then followed by a second note on April 30, 2001, accompanied by a request from the DPR to the MPR for a special session to be held. 

Abdurrahman Wahid responded to this effort by issuing a decree declaring the dissolution of the MPR/DPR, setting up elections within a year, and the suspension of the Golkar Party. But in the end he didn't get any support and the MPR approved the dismissal of Abdurrahman Wahid as President. He was replaced by Vice President Megawati Soekarnoputri through a Special Session on July 23, 2001.

Impeachment
On July 23, 2001, 15:00 Western Indonesia Time (UTC+7), the MPR held a plenary meeting to vote the impeachment of Wahid, there were factions from F-KB and F-PDKB that attended the meeting. The result of the vote was 591 votes in favor of dismissing President Abdurrahman Wahid as well as appointing Vice President Megawati Sukarnoputri as the replacement President.

Aftermath

On 23 July 2001, as a response to Abdurrahman Wahid's Decree, the People's Consultative Assembly (MPR) held a special session to impeach Wahid, which was successful. The Assembly subsequently swore in Vice President Megawati as the new president. Megawati was the first woman to be the President of Indonesia. 

The MPR Special Session also scheduled the election of a Vice President which was vacant due to Megawati's ascension to the presidency. There were five candidates, namely Agum Gumelar who was proposed by the F-PDU, Susilo Bambang Yudhoyono who was proposed by the F-KKI and 80 MPR members, Akbar Tandjung by the F-PG, Hamzah Haz who was proposed by the F-PPP and the Reform Faction, and Siswono Yudo Husodo, proposed by the 79 MPR Members. The election took place at the 5th plenary session of the MPR on Wednesday, 25 July 2003.

Because there were no candidates who met the requirements to get votes, that is, out of half the number of legislative members present, a third round of elections was held. In this third round, Hamzah Haz was elected vice president after winning 340 votes out of 610 total votes. Meanwhile, Akbar Tandjung received 237 votes, leaving only 29 abstain and 4 invalid votes.

Controversies
On Sunday, 22 August 2021, Indonesian Coordinating Minister for Political, Legal, and Security Affairs, Mahfud MD, made a statement on Abdurrahman Wahid's Impeachment. In Mahfud's statement which he said on NU YouTube Channel, expressed that Wahid's impeachment was unconstitutional and an unlawful action. Mahfud MD stated that the impeachment of Gus Dur in 2001 was not in accordance to the Resolutions of the People's Consultative Assembly (Indonesian: Ketetapan Majelis Permusyawaratan Rakyat) No.III of 1978 about the Position and Work System of the Highest State Institution with/or State High Institutions. Mahfud also expressed that Gus Dur impeachment by the Special Session of the People's Consultative Assembly have different cases between memorandums I, II, and III.

References

Notes

Bibliography
 

Legal history of Indonesia
Post-Suharto era
2001 in Indonesia